Bogogobo is a village in Kgalagadi District of Botswana. It is located close to the border with South Africa and has a primary school. The population was 360 in 2011 census.

Demographics

According to 2011 census the village population was 360.

References

Kgalagadi District
Villages in Botswana